The Saint Peter's Peacocks women's basketball team is the women's basketball team that represents Saint Peter's University in Jersey City, New Jersey. The school's team currently competes in the Metro Atlantic Athletic Conference. As with the other women's athletic programs of Saint Peter's University, it was previously known as the Peahens.

Postseason

NCAA Division I
The Peahens have made seven appearances in the NCAA Tournament. They have a record of 0–7.

AIAW College Division/Division II
The Peahens made one appearance in the AIAW National Division II basketball tournament, with a combined record of 1–1.

References

External links